Sylvia Margaret Wiegand (born March 8, 1945) is an American mathematician.

Early life and education
Wiegand was born in Cape Town, South Africa. She is the daughter of mathematician Laurence Chisholm Young and through him the grand-daughter of mathematicians Grace Chisholm Young and William Henry Young. Her family moved to Wisconsin in 1949, and she graduated from Bryn Mawr College in 1966 after three years of study. In 1971 Wiegand earned her Ph.D. from the University of Wisconsin-Madison. Her dissertation was titled Galois Theory of Essential Expansions of Modules and Vanishing Tensor Powers.

Career 
In 1987, she was named full professor at the University of Nebraska; at the time Wiegand was the only female professor in the department.  In 1988 Sylvia headed a search committee for two new jobs in the math department, for which two women were hired, although one stayed only a year and another left after four years.  In 1996 Sylvia and her husband, Roger Wiegand, established a fellowship for graduate student research at the university in honor of Sylvia's grandparents.

From 1997 until 2000, Wiegand was president of the Association for Women in Mathematics.

Wiegand has been an editor for Communications in Algebra and the Rocky Mountain Journal of Mathematics.  She was on the board of directors of the Canadian Mathematical Society from 1997 to 2000.

Awards and recognition
Wiegand is featured in the book Notable Women in Mathematics: A Biographical Dictionary, edited by Charlene Morrow and Teri Perl, published in 1998. For her work in improving the status of women in mathematics, she was awarded the University of Nebraska's Outstanding Contribution to the Status of Women Award in 2000. In May 2005, the University of Nebraska hosted the Nebraska Commutative Algebra Conference: WiegandFest "in celebration of the many important contributions of Sylvia and her husband Roger Wiegand."

In 2012 she became a fellow of the American Mathematical Society.

In 2017, she was selected as a fellow of the Association for Women in Mathematics in the inaugural class.

References

External links
 Sylvia Wiegand's homepage
 Sylvia Wiegand's Author profile on MathSciNet

1945 births
Living people
20th-century American mathematicians
21st-century American mathematicians
American women mathematicians
Fellows of the American Mathematical Society
Bryn Mawr College alumni
University of Wisconsin–Madison alumni
University of Nebraska faculty
Fellows of the Association for Women in Mathematics
20th-century women mathematicians
21st-century women mathematicians
20th-century American women
21st-century American women